The Yangtze River power line crossings are overhead power lines that cross the Yangtze River in China. There are at least three power line crossings on the Yangtze River at Jiangyin, Nanjing, and Wuhu. The towers of the crossing in Jiangyin are among the highest in the world.

Jiangyin

One exists at Jiangyin, Jiangsu Province, China. It is a section of the 500 kV power line from the Yancheng power station to the Dou Shan substation in the province of Jiangsu. They are identical lattice towers of square cross section with an area of  × 68 m at the base and  × 8 m at the top. These pylons are both equipped with an elevator which runs in a cylindrical tube in its center. A spiral staircase circles the elevator shaft outside.

On each side of the river are each main span pylon, followed by two anchor towers; one for each circuit.

Construction of the pylons started on November 8, 2002. They were completed on April 13, 2004. On November 18, 2004, the power line went into service.

Nanjing

A dual circuit, 500 kV AC overhead powerline crosses the Yangtze River at Nanjing, Jiangsu Province, China, built in 1992.

Wuhu
The pylons were built in 2003. Both AC crossings have 6 conductors.

See also

Lattice tower
Yangtze River bridges and tunnels
List of tallest buildings and structures in the world
List of tallest freestanding structures in the world
List of tallest freestanding steel structures

References

External links
 SkyscraperPage - Yangtze River Crossing - Pylon I and Pylon II
 Yangtze River Crossing article from Elevator World magazine
 
 Alimak lifts at work: Electricity transmission tower

Powerline river crossings
Yangtze River
Electric power infrastructure in China